Carlo Mannello (Latin: Carolus Mannellus) (born 1618) was a Roman Catholic prelate who served as Bishop of Termoli (1653–1662).

Biography
Carlo Mannello was born in 1618 in Aversa, Italy.
On 3 Feb 1653, he was appointed during the papacy of Pope Innocent X as Bishop of Termoli.
He served as Bishop of Termoli until his resignation in 1662.

References

External links and additional sources
 (Chronology of Bishops) 
 (Chronology of Bishops) 

17th-century Italian Roman Catholic bishops
Bishops appointed by Pope Innocent X
1618 births
People from Aversa